Ātma-bodha (Sanskrit: आत्मबोधः ) is a short Sanskrit text attributed to Adi Shankara of Advaita Vedanta school of Hindu philosophy. The text in sixty-eight verses describes the path to Self-knowledge or the awareness of Atman.

The Vedanta tradition states that the text was written by Shankara for his disciple, Sanandana, also known as Padmapāda.

Atmabodha is also the title of an Upanishad attached to the Atharvaveda.

Etymology
Atmabodha means "Self-knowledge", self-awareness, or one with the "possession of a knowledge of soul or the supreme spirit".

Authorship

The authorship of Ātma-bodha, written in Sanskrit language, is traditionally ascribed to Adi Shankara who is believed to have lived in the 8th century A.D. According to Isaeva, even though the authenticity of this work is doubted by present day scholars, it does not contradict the whole of Shankara's system which it advocates. Yet, in contrast to Shankara, the Atma Bodha argues for constant practice and meditation, whereas Shankara rejected 'activity' and argued for an immediate acquirement of knowledge.

Contents

The original text consists of sixty-eight verses and describes the way to the attainment of the knowledge of the Atman. As the Vivekachudamani, the Atma Bodha teaches that the Ultimate Reality or Brahman, the foundation of all, is beyond name and form, is of the nature of Pure Consciousness, but who can be realized by pursuing the Path of Knowledge, not by worship.

Atmabodha text reiterates that the Path of Knowledge consists in shravana (hearing the instructions of a teacher), manana (reflecting on what is heard) and nididhyasana (meditating on Truth with single-minded devotion); viveka (philosophical discrimination) and vairagya (renunciation of all that which is unreal) are the basic disciplines required to be followed and that it is not possible for religious actions (Karma, fasting, vows, pilgrimage) to destroy ignorance (avidya) and cause liberation (moksha) –

Atma Bodha describes the world and the individual soul are in true essence Brahman, the Absolute Reality, with the nature of Sat-chit-anand, or truth-consciousness-bliss. Brahman is the substratum on which is projected by imagination all the manifested things of the world; the all-pervading Atman illumining the mind and the senses shines in the intellect (Buddhi) just as the reflection in a mirror.

The self-abiding Jivanmukta, states verses 49-51 of Atmabodha, is satisfied with his state of bliss derived from Atman (soul, self), is free from hate for anyone, seeks unity, is perfected in peace, grows radiant, rejoices with what he has, is the one who "shines inwardly, like a lamp placed inside a vase".

Commentaries and translations
Nikhilananda states that Shankara's Vedic non-dualistic (Advaita) philosophy is based on the divinity of the soul, the unity of existence, the Oneness of the Godhead.

The first translation of Ātma-bodha into English language from Sanskrit by J. Taylor was published in 1812 titled - The Knowledge of Spirit, later another translation rendered by Rev. J.F.Kearns, along with English commentary and titled - Atma Bodha Prakashika, was published in the May, 1876 issue of The Indian Antiquary (pages 125-133). An English translation and commentary of 1944 by Swami Nikhilananda was published in India in June, 1947 by Sri Ramakrishna Math, Chennai. Ramana translated Ātma-bodha into Tamil in verse-form. Chinmayananda Saraswati has also written a translation of the same.

See also
Brahma Sutras
Upadesasahasri

References

Sanskrit texts
Advaita Vedanta
Sanskrit poetry
8th-century poems
Adi Shankara
Advaita Vedanta texts